Thomas Hums (born ) is a Canadian male  track cyclist, riding for the national team. He competed in the team sprint event at the 2011 UCI Track Cycling World Championships.

References

External links
 Profile at cyclingarchives.com

1989 births
Living people
Canadian track cyclists
Canadian male cyclists
Place of birth missing (living people)
20th-century Canadian people
21st-century Canadian people